Multitude is the third album by Belgian musician Stromae. It was released through Mosaert on 4 March 2022. It is his first studio album following his hiatus and since Racine carrée in 2013. The first single, "Santé", was released on 15 October 2021. Multitude also includes various music styles from different cultures, as seen in "Santé" and "L'enfer". During an interview with TF1, he stated that his album was influenced by the frequent travelling he and his mother would do.

Singles 

"Santé" was released as the lead single on 15 October 2021, accompanied with a music video.

"L'enfer" was released as the second single on 9 January 2022 after he performed it live during an interview on TF1.

"Fils de joie" was released as the third single on 23 June 2022.

A duet version of "Mon amour" with Camila Cabello was released as the fourth single on 27 July 2022.

Track listing

Charts

Weekly charts

Year-end charts

Certifications

References 

2022 albums
French-language albums
Stromae albums